Albert Walter Irvine (7 May 1898 – 1975) was an English professional footballer who played as a full-back.

References

1898 births
1935 deaths
Footballers from Newcastle upon Tyne
English footballers
Association football fullbacks
Walker Celtic F.C. players
Mid Rhondda F.C. players
Grimsby Town F.C. players
Boston Town F.C. players
English Football League players